Cody Wylie is an American businessman and politician. He was elected to the Wyoming House of Representatives in the 2022 Wyoming House of Representatives General Election to the 39th district.

Early life

Wylie was born in Rock Springs, Wyoming and graduated from the Western Wyoming Community College with a degree in Political Science in 2008. He would go on to graduate from the University of Wyoming earning a B.S. in Political Science in 2011. He would work as vice president for his father's construction company until 2020. He describes himself as a Christian.

Career

In 2020 Wylie served on the Rock Springs Planning and Zoning Commission before running for the Wyoming House of Representatives for the 39th district. He ran against the incumbent Marshall Burt (L). Wylie ran on a campaign promoting conservative values as well as economic diversification and protecting Sweetwater County's standard of living. He would go on to win with 75.1% of the vote. As representative, Wylie is a member of the House Corporations, Elections & Political Subdivisions committee
and the House Transportation, Highways & Military Affairs committee. He has sponsered HB0153 which failed to pass, but would have increased Wyoming's Worker's compensation to be competitive with national levels.

Electoral History

Personal life
Wiley is married to his wife, Maria, and has one kid.

References

Living people
21st-century American politicians
Members of the Wyoming House of Representatives
University of Wyoming alumni
Wyoming Republicans
Year of birth missing (living people)